Devon Welsh (born September 3, 1988) is a Canadian singer and songwriter. From 2010 to 2016, he was the frontman of the electropop duo Majical Cloudz. He released his debut solo album, Dream Songs, in 2018.

Early life and education
Welsh was born to film and television actor Kenneth Welsh. He lived in Sandford, Ontario, a community of Uxbridge, for a few years. His parents separated when he was four. He entered McGill University in 2007 and graduated in 2011 with a degree in comparative religion.

Career
Welsh released his debut solo album, Dream Songs, on August 24, 2018. The album was produced by Austin Tufts of Braids and self-released on You Are Accepted, a record label created by Welsh.

Personal life
From 2007 to 2010, Welsh was in an on-and-off relationship with Claire Boucher, known professionally as Grimes. The two met in 2007 at a first-year dorm party while studying at McGill University.

Discography

Solo albums
 Dream Songs (2018)
 True Love (2019)

Compilation albums
 Down the Mountain (2016)

With Belave
 Darlet on the Brush (2014)
 Indigo, Streams, Lash. (2016)
 the world is rain. (2017)

With Majical Cloudz
 Majical Cloudz (2010)
 II (2011)
 Impersonator (2013)
 Are You Alone? (2015)

References

External links

 
 
 

1988 births
Living people
21st-century Canadian male singers
McGill University alumni
Place of birth missing (living people)
People from Uxbridge, Ontario